WAIF (88.3 FM) is a community radio station licensed to Cincinnati, Ohio.

Overview

WAIF is an all-volunteer community radio station.  WAIF reception varies because of the hilly local terrain, but it can be heard over the air within the Cincinnati-area I-275 belt in Southwestern Ohio, Northern Kentucky, and Southeastern Indiana.  WAIF also broadcasts over the Internet.

Organizing for the station began in 1973. WAIF went on the air in 1975.  Rather than wait for an open frequency, the organizers decided to share the 88.3 MHz frequency with the local vocational school's station, WJVS, an arrangement that remained in place until WJVS ceased operations on May 10, 2012 (over a week earlier than expected), following the failure of its transmitter. Prior to this,  WJVS broadcast on the 88.3 frequency during regular school hours, while WAIF broadcast at all other times.

WAIF is managed by a Board of Trustees of between 7 and 11 members, elected to two-year terms at an annual membership meeting in September of each year.  The Board of Trustees elects officers and appoints staff and management for the station.

WAIF's motto is "What Radio Is Meant To Be"  Originally, the station referred to their organization as "Stepchild Radio", and had close ties to WYSO, the Antioch College station in Yellow Springs.

Programming 

Over the years WAIF has broadcast the work of more than a thousand volunteer programmers, producers and activists. As of June 2006, local programmers do all programming.  Individual programs vary in length, but run between one and three hours, once a week.

Music programs
 Gospel
 Jazz
 Doo-Wop
 Bluegrass
 Blues
 Surf Music
 Hip-Hop
 Christian Progressive
 Rock
 Local
 Caribbean
 Independent
 Folk
 Novelty Music

Talk-radio programs
 Current Affairs
 African Perspectives on the News
 African Village Buka
 International Talk
 Labor Unions
 Women's Issues
 Racial Issues
 Local Affairs

Ethnic heritage programs
 German
 Italian
 Greek
 Native American
 Indian & Pakistani
 Africa
 Latin 
 Appalachian
 Argentine

Previous programs
 The Chris & Rob Late Night Talk Show

See also
WAIF Kids

References

External links
WAIFradio.org – official website

AIF
Community radio stations in the United States